Uday Ramachandran is an Indian playback singer, composer, carnatic musician and a voice trainer. He has recorded songs for a number of Malayalam movies and albums. Ramachandran has recorded more than 500 songs in Malayalam. He has performed at more than a hundred stage shows in India and abroad. 

Ramachandran's music company Charu Creations launched in 2014 and created various albums.

Early life
Ramachandran was born into a family of musicians with eight other 'Ganabhooshanam' holders  at Vaikom to  Mr.V.N.Ramachandran and Mrs. V.N. Thankamani. His father's elder brother, Sri Vaikom V.N. Rajan was his first music guru  beginning in 1985. He started his academic music training at R.L.V. Music Academy, Thrippunithura. He was trained in Carnatic Music by Sri N.P.Ramaswami,  and Hindustani Music by Ustad Faiyaz Khan and Mohan Kumar (disciple of Pandit Ramesh Narayan). 

Ramachandran's talent and dedication won him prizes during his school and college days. He won the light music competition at All India Universities Youth Festival 1999. He won the MG University Youth festival with A Grade in light music competition consecutively in 1998, 1999 and 2000.

Career 
He was a finalist in the reality show Gandharvasangeetham in Kairali TV. Ramachandran was an Announcer and ‘B High’ Grade Artist for All India Radio. He later worked as an administrator and a manager in the health care industry. He associated with Asha Hospital, Vatakara, Kozhikode (2008 Nov – 2010 Dec) as Manager  Administration and in Lakshmi Hospital, Ernakulum (1998 TO 2007) as Manager of Administration.

Ramachandran has worked on audio albums and film songs. He rendered songs for various remakes and has released more than 500 audio cassettes and CDs. He collaborated with legends, including G. Devarajan Master, Perumbavoor G. Raveendranath, Raveendran Mash, Rajamani, Vidhaydharan Mash, Jayavijaya (Jayan), Mankombu Gopalakrishnan, Darshan Raman, T.S.Radhakrishnaji, Bijibal, Santhosh Varma, Karthik Prakash, and Neeraj Gopal. His entry to playback singing was marked by a song in the movie  Doctor Innocent Aanu and rendered a beautiful melody, "Ormakalkkoppam", in the movie Namboothiri Yuvavu @ 43. Recently Ramachandran voiced an M Mohanan Movie My God under Bijibal's music composition.

Kuwait (2010 to 2012) 
Ramachandran was instrumental in setting up the first Malayalam radio station in Kuwait – 98.4 Ufm. He was the administration head and the music manager. Ramachandran’s Live show Heart-Throbs attracted thousands of listeners.

Discography

Latest Selected Albums 2018

References

External links
 
 

21st-century Indian male classical singers
Year of birth missing (living people)
Living people
Singers from Kerala
People from Vaikom